Henry Gerald Beenders (June 2, 1916 – October 27, 2003) was a Dutch-American professional basketball player.

Early life
Beenders was born in Haarlem, Netherlands, and migrated to the United States at age eight. He lived in Brooklyn, New York, and Scotch Plains, New Jersey, before moving to Bridgewater Township, New Jersey, in the late 1960s. He attended North Plainfield High School in North Plainfield, New Jersey.

Playing career
Beenders played the center position on the 1941 NIT champion Long Island University team, and was team captain during the 1941–42 season under Hall of Fame coach Clair Bee. He served with the United States Army Air Forces during World War II. Beenders was one of the first international basketball players in the Basketball Association of America (BAA), which became the National Basketball Association (NBA). Beenders averaged 12.3 points in his rookie season with Providence, which was 13th best in the league that season. He played for Providence the following season until he was sold to the Philadelphia Warriors on January 15, 1948. On May 1, 1948, Beenders was traded to the Boston Celtics with Chick Halbert for Ed Sadowski.

Later life
After ending his basketball career, Beenders worked as an international sales representative for a clothing exporting company in New York City for 35 years. He was 87 when he died at the Somerset Medical Center in Somerville, New Jersey.

BAA career statistics

Regular season

Playoffs

References

1916 births
2003 deaths
American men's basketball players
Basketball players from New Jersey
Boston Celtics players
Centers (basketball)
Dutch men's basketball players
Dutch emigrants to the United States
LIU Brooklyn Blackbirds men's basketball players
North Plainfield High School alumni
Paterson Crescents players
Philadelphia Warriors players
People from Bridgewater Township, New Jersey
People from North Plainfield, New Jersey
People from Scotch Plains, New Jersey
Providence Steamrollers players
Sportspeople from Haarlem
Sportspeople from Somerset County, New Jersey
Sportspeople from Union County, New Jersey
United States Army Air Forces personnel of World War II
United States Army Air Forces soldiers